Herbaspirillum huttiense is a Gram-negative species of  bacteria.

References

Further reading

External links
Type strain of Herbaspirillum huttiense at BacDive -  the Bacterial Diversity Metadatabase

Burkholderiales
Bacteria described in 2004